The High Priest of Osiris served at Abydos.

Some high priests were:

References

.
Ancient Egyptian titles